Miller Hall is a historic building located on the campus of Waynesburg University at Waynesburg in Greene County, Pennsylvania. It is located directly to the east of Hanna Hall. It was built between 1879 and 1899, and is a three-story, brick and sandstone building in the Second Empire-style.  It has a mansard roof and measures 158 feet long and 54 feet wide, with an 86 feet long and 50 feet wide cross-section.  It was named for Alfred Brashear Miller, President of Waynesburg College from 1859 to 1899.  The building has housed administrative offices, classrooms, a laboratory, library, and chapel.  The building also houses Alumni Hall and the "Martin Room."

It was listed on the National Register of Historic Places in 1978. It is included in the Waynesburg Historic District.

References 

Waynesburg University
School buildings on the National Register of Historic Places in Pennsylvania
Second Empire architecture in Pennsylvania
School buildings completed in 1899
Schools in Greene County, Pennsylvania
National Register of Historic Places in Greene County, Pennsylvania
1899 establishments in Pennsylvania